The 1960–61 Southern Football League season was the 58th in the history of the league, an English football competition.

Oxford United won the championship, whilst Kettering Town, Cambridge United, Bexleyheath & Welling and Merthyr Tydfil were all promoted to the Premier Division. Ten Southern League clubs applied to join the Football League at the end of the season, but none were successful.

Premier Division
The Premier Division consisted of 22 clubs, including 18 clubs from the previous season and four new clubs, promoted from Division One:
Clacton Town
Folkestone Town
Guildford City
Romford

League table

Division One
Division One consisted of 21 clubs, including 16 clubs from the previous season and five new clubs:
Four clubs relegated from the Premier Division:
Barry Town
Kettering Town
Nuneaton Borough
Poole Town

Plus:
Canterbury City, elected from the Metropolitan League

League table

Football League elections
Ten Southern League clubs (including Bexleyheath & Welling and Kettering Town from Division One) applied for election to the Football League. However, all four League clubs were re-elected.

References

Southern Football League seasons
S